Carla Nyenhuis ( Nelte, born 21 September 1990) is a German badminton player. She started playing badminton at 5 years old in her hometown and became a national team member in 2009.  In 2014, she took double victories at the Brasil Open in the women's and mixed doubles event.  Teamed-up with Johanna Goliszewski in the women's doubles, they competed at the 2016 Summer Olympics held in Rio de Janeiro, Brazil.

Achievements

BWF World Tour 
The BWF World Tour, which was announced on 19 March 2017 and implemented in 2018, is a series of elite badminton tournaments sanctioned by the Badminton World Federation (BWF). The BWF World Tours are divided into levels of World Tour Finals, Super 1000, Super 750, Super 500, Super 300 (part of the HSBC World Tour), and the BWF Tour Super 100.

Women's doubles

BWF Grand Prix 
The BWF Grand Prix had two levels, the Grand Prix and Grand Prix Gold. It was a series of badminton tournaments sanctioned by the Badminton World Federation (BWF) and played between 2007 and 2017.

Women's doubles

Mixed doubles

  BWF Grand Prix Gold tournament
  BWF Grand Prix tournament

BWF International Challenge/Series 
Women's doubles

Mixed doubles

  BWF International Challenge tournament
  BWF International Series tournament
  BWF Future Series tournament

References

External links 
 
 
 
 
 
 

1990 births
Living people
Sportspeople from Brandenburg
German female badminton players
Badminton players at the 2016 Summer Olympics
Olympic badminton players of Germany